Valdemanco del Esteras is a municipality in the  province of Ciudad Real, Castile-La Mancha, Spain. It has a population of 247.

References

Municipalities in the Province of Ciudad Real